Abortion in Arkansas is illegal except when it is necessary to save the life of the mother. Doctors determined to have performed an abortion face up to 10 years in prison and fines up to $100,000.

History

Legislative history 

By the end of the 1800s, all states in the Union except Louisiana had therapeutic exceptions in their legislative bans on abortions. In the late 1960s and early 1970s, Arkansas, Colorado, Georgia, Maryland, New Mexico, North Carolina and Oregon made reforms to their abortion laws, with most of these states providing more detailed medical guidance on when therapeutic abortions could be performed. An amendment to the state constitution in 1988 said, "The policy of Arkansas is to protect the life of every unborn child from conception until birth, to the extent permitted by the Federal Constitution.

The state was one of twenty-three states in 2007 to have a detailed abortion-specific informed consent requirement. Georgia, Michigan, Arkansas and Idaho all required in 2007 that women must be provided by an abortion clinic with the option to view an image of their fetus if an ultrasound is used prior to the abortion taking place. Arkansas, Minnesota and Oklahoma all require that women seeking abortions after 20-weeks be verbally informed that the fetus may feel pain during the abortion procedure despite a Journal of the American Medical Association conclusion that pain sensors do not develop in the fetus until between weeks 23 and 30. Informed consent materials about fetal pain at 20-weeks in Arkansas, Georgia and Oklahoma says, "the unborn child has the physical structures necessary to experience pain." The Journal of the American Medical Association has concluded that pain sensors do not develop in the fetus until between weeks 23 and 30. In 2013, state Targeted Regulation of Abortion Providers (TRAP) law applied to medication induced abortions and private doctor offices.

A bill banning abortion after twelve weeks was passed on January 31, 2013, by the Arkansas Senate, but vetoed in Arkansas by Governor Mike Beebe, but, on March 6, 2013, his veto was overridden by the Arkansas House of Representatives. A federal judge issued a temporary injunction against the Arkansas law in May 2013, and in March 2014, it was struck down by federal judge Susan Webber Wright, who described the law as unconstitutional.

Judicial history 
The US Supreme Court's decision in 1973's Roe v. Wade ruling meant the state could no longer regulate abortion in the first trimester.

In May 2013, a federal judge blocked the implementation of the legislation passed in March 2013. On May 27, 2015, the Eighth Circuit Court of Appeals affirmed a lower court ruling and permanently blocked the law from being enforced. In January 2016, the U.S. Supreme Court declined to review the case, leaving the Eighth Circuit's ruling in place.

Clinic history 

Between 1982 and 1992, the number of abortion clinics in the state decreased by five, going from thirteen in 1982 to eight in 1992. In 2014, there were three abortion clinics in the state. In 2014, 97% of the counties in the state did not have an abortion clinic. That year, 77% of women in the state aged 15–44 lived in a county without an abortion clinic. As of 2019, the state had one Planned Parenthood clinic, which offered abortion services.

Statistics 

In the period between 1972 and 1974, there were zero recorded illegal abortion deaths in the state. In 1990, 241,000 women in the state faced the risk of an unintended pregnancy. In 2010, the state had no publicly funded abortions. In 2013, among white women aged 15–19, there were 270 abortions, 240 abortions for black women aged 15–19, 40 abortions for Hispanic women aged 15–19, and 10 abortions for women of all other races. In 2014, 38% of adults said in a poll by the Pew Research Center that abortion should be legal in all or most cases. In 2017, the state had an infant mortality rate of 8.2 deaths per 1,000 live births.

Abortion rights views and activities

Protests 
Women from the state participated in marches supporting abortion rights as part of a #StoptheBans movement in May 2019.

References 

Arkansas
Healthcare in Arkansas
Women in Arkansas